Luke Gareth Le Roux (born 10 March 2000) is a South African soccer player currently playing as a midfielder for Varbergs BoIS and the South African National Team.

Career statistics

Club

Notes

References

2000 births
Living people
South African soccer players
South African expatriate soccer players
Association football midfielders
National First Division players
Allsvenskan players
Ikapa Sporting F.C. players
SuperSport United F.C. players
Stellenbosch F.C. players
Varbergs BoIS players
South African expatriate sportspeople in Sweden
Expatriate footballers in Sweden
South Africa youth international soccer players
South Africa under-20 international soccer players